Elspeth Marinha C Fowler (born 14 August 1992) is an English-born Spanish cricketer who plays for the Spanish women's national cricket team as a right handed batter. In May 2022, she captained the team in her and the team's debut Women's Twenty20 International (WT20I), against Austria.

Early life and education
Fowler was born in Northampton, England, and raised in Chesham, Buckinghamshire. At the age of 8, she first went along to the Sunday morning sessions at her local cricket club; she has since written that she received a great deal of support there from her teammates and coaches.

Between 2003 and 2010, Fowler attended Chesham High School (now Chesham Grammar School). In 2005, she played for Buckinghamshire Girls Under 13 team, and between 2006 and 2008 she progressed through the county's Girls Under 17 and Under 19 teams.

In 2010, Fowler left high school with A-Levels in French, History, Italian and Mathematics. She also "went up" to Pembroke College, Cambridge. There, between 2010 and 2014, she completed a Bachelor of Arts with first class honours in Modern and Medieval Languages (French and Italian).

While at Cambridge, Fowler played for the Cambridge University Cricket Club, earning half blues in 2011, 2012 and 2014. She also played for the Pembroke College Women's Basketball Team, and was involved in the Cambridge Philharmonic Orchestra and Philharmonia.

Domestic career
In 2010, Fowler was a member of the Buckinghamshire First XI. In 2016, she played two Women's Twenty20 Cup matches for Cambridgeshire.

Since 2019, she has played for the La Manga Torrevieja cricket club, in the region of Murcia, southeastern Spain. In November 2019, while touring with the LMTCC men's team in Cártama, she helped bowl the team to victory in a weekend tournament.

As of 2020, Fowler was also Director of Women's Cricket for Cricket Spain. In that capacity, she has been involved in training women cricketers. In July 2021, she made her captaincy debut, at the helm of LMTCC's Development XI, in a 40-over match against Torre Pacheco at the La Manga Club Ground.

Also in 2021, she played for Team White in Cricket Catalonia's women's T10 tournament.

International career
On 5 May 2022, Fowler made her WT20I debut for, and also captained, Spain against Austria in the first match of the 2022 France Women's T20I Quadrangular Series, held at Dreux Sport Cricket Club, Dreux, France. The match was also Spain's first ever WT20I, and Fowler top scored for her team with 26 in 36 balls.

The following day, 6 May 2022, against Jersey, Fowler repeated and improved on that achievement, with 29 in 46 balls. She did even better in a second match against Austria on 7 May 2022, with 44 in 50 balls, and in Spain's final match of the tournament, against France on 8 May 2022, with 42* in 58 balls. She finished the tournament as the leading run scorer, with 141 runs, and with a WT20I batting average of 47.00. The Spanish players did not win any of their matches, but, according to Cricket Spain's website, "... took positives from all the four games they played in."

Off the field
Since 2016, Fowler has been an account manager, based in Murcia, for G's Group, a fresh produce business headquartered in East Anglia, England.

Fowler's cricketing nickname, bestowed upon her in 2019 by her then-new teammates at La Manga Torrevieja, is Hermione Granger. While on cricket tours, she is accompanied by her mascot, a stuffed toy monkey named Crookshanks.

See also 
 List of Spain women Twenty20 International cricketers

References

External links 
 

Living people
1992 births
Alumni of Pembroke College, Cambridge
Buckinghamshire women cricketers
Cambridgeshire women cricketers
People from Northamptonshire
Spain women Twenty20 International cricketers